Vyacheslav Derkach (born 23 June 1976) is a former Ukrainian biathlete.

Career
Derkach competed in the 1998, 2002, 2006 and 2010 Winter Olympics for Ukraine. His best performance was 7th, as part of the 2002 Ukrainian relay team. His best individual performance was 23rd, in the 2002 individual. In 1998, he finished 50th in the individual and 18th as part of the relay team. In 2002, he finished 36th in the sprint and 40th in the relay. In 2006, he finished 72nd in the sprint. In 2010, he finished 77th in the sprint and 8th as part of the relay team.

His best performance at the Biathlon World Championships, is 5th, as part of the 2009 Ukrainian men's relay team. His best individual performance is 16th, in the 2008 sprint.

Derkach has earned four Biathlon World Cup podium finishes. His best is a silver, as part of the Ukrainian men's relay team in Hochfilzen during the 2000–01 season. He has also won a pair of individual bronze medals, in the pursuit at Pokljuka in 1999–2000 and the mass start at Osrblie in 2001–02. His best overall finish in the Biathlon World Cup is 22nd, in 2000–01.

His last individual competition at the World Cup level was the Olympic sprint in Vancouver, whilst the last relay was the Olympic relay, where he shot cleanly, requiring no spare rounds.

Derkach announced his retirement after the 2010–11 season, citing a hip injury and family responsibilities.

Personal life
Since 2001, he is married to Ukrainian biathlete Oksana Khvostenko.

Biathlon results
All results are sourced from the International Biathlon Union.

Olympic Games

*Pursuit was added as an event in 2002, with mass start being added in 2006.

World Championships

*During Olympic seasons competitions are only held for those events not included in the Olympic program.
**Team was removed as an event in 1998, and pursuit was added in 1997 with mass start being added in 1999 and the mixed relay in 2005.

References

External links
 

1976 births
Living people
People from Pryluky
Ukrainian male biathletes
Biathletes at the 1998 Winter Olympics
Biathletes at the 2002 Winter Olympics
Biathletes at the 2006 Winter Olympics
Biathletes at the 2010 Winter Olympics
Olympic biathletes of Ukraine
Universiade medalists in biathlon
Universiade gold medalists for Ukraine
Competitors at the 2003 Winter Universiade
Sportspeople from Chernihiv Oblast